Fortuna is the sixth solo studio album by Italian singer-songwriter Emma Marrone, released by Universal Music Italy and Polydor Records on 25 October 2019.

Background 
After the completion of the Essere qui tour in March 2019, Emma travelled to Los Angeles to begin work on her next album. Describing the process, she said "I took my time, I experienced abroad and I opened my mind in a metropolis that is not your home", adding that this helped her understand who she is and what she wanted to do.

Composition and lyrical content 
In an interview, Emma said that Fortuna represented who she is now: a serene, continuously changing person projected towards the future. One of the album's most prominent themes is positivity, with the title track focusing on viewing things positively and the importance of trying, whether you succeed or not.

The album calls upon a variety of musical influences, with an array of producers including Dario Faini, Luca Mattoni, Elisa Toffoli, Andrea Rigonat and Frenetik & Orang3. Emma is credited as a co-writer on three of the album's tracks: "Fortuna", "Alibi" and "Dimmelo veramente", the latter of which focuses on modern-day emotions and the anxiety that social media causes.

"Stupida allegria" was co-written by Franco126 after an evening of drinking in Milan and discussing "feelings about life, Rome and the sense of beauty".

Singles 
On 6 September 2019, Emma released "Io sono bella" as Fortuna's lead single. The song was written by Vasco Rossi, Gaetano Curreri, Gerardo Pulli and Piero Romitelli, and produced by Dardust. It was recorded at Speakeasy Studio in Los Angeles  by Marco Sonzini. An accompanying music video for the song was directed by Paolo Mannarino and uploaded to Emma's official YouTube channel on 9 September 2019. The song debuted and peaked at number 33 on the Italian singles chart. In October 2019, the song reached the top of the Italian airplay chart.

Release and promotion 
On 16 October 2019, Emma announced that her sixth solo studio album Fortuna would be released on 25 October 2019, via a video on her social media accounts. In addition to the album's title and release date, Emma revealed the cover and announced a concert on 25 May 2020, her birthday, at the Arena di Verona, to celebrate Fortuna and ten years of her solo music career. Of the album cover, Emma said that she wanted a cover that fit with the album's sound and lyrics, and that "it shows a woman who can be anything she wants, the important thing is what you can't see".

On 17 October, Emma revealed the album's track listing. Fortuna was made available to pre-order on iTunes the following day.

Following its release on 25 October, Fortuna debuted atop the Italian album chart, becoming her first album to top the chart since 2013's Schiena.

Critical reception 

Fortuna received positive reviews from music critics. Writing for All Music Italia, Fabio Fiume praised the album as "Emma's most beautiful yet", for establishing her artistic maturity. He also highlighted Dardust's production, writing that "he is capable of turning everything that glitters into gold". Concluding his review, Fiume wrote "Emma has definitively transformed herself into the queen of our contemporary pop and giving her that place is not an exaggeration; her throne rests on real credibility in whatever she does". In their review, Rockol commended Fortunas variety, with Emma's traditional ballads: "Luci blu", "I grandi progetti" and "A mano disarmata", rock songs: "Io sono bella", "Mascara" and "Fortuna", as well as a new sound, highlighting "Stupida allegria"'s rap-like stanzas. Writing for Newsic, Elena Rebecca Odelli also mentioned the album's new sound for Emma, calling Fortuna "a record that opens Marrone to a new era". Odelli chose "Stupida allegria", "Luci blu" and "A mano disarmata" as her recommended tracks.

 Track listing 

 Personnel 
Credits from All Music Italia.Production Dario Faini  – producer 
 Luca Mattoni – producer 
 Elisa Toffoli – producer 
 Frenetik & Orang3 – producer Vocals Emma Marrone – lead vocalsTechnical Marco Sonzini  – mixing 
 Pino Pischetola  – mixing 
 Luca Vittori  – mixing 
 Andrea Rigonat  – mixing 
 Reuben Cohen  – masteringArt'
 Emilio Tini – art direction
 Paolo De Francesco  – cover art

Charts

Release history

Notes

References 

2019 albums
Emma Marrone albums